All the Way with You (Chinese: 一路上有你) is a Chinese reality show that aired on Zhejiang Television.

Format 
Three celebrity couples, live under one roof and they are given a mission to complete.

Cast member 
It is the first Chinese variety that Kim Heechul was in charge since his debut in Korean entertainment in 2005.

 Host
 Kim Hee-chul

 Season 1

 Couples
 Julian Cheung & Anita Yuen
 Tian Liang & Yiqian Ye
 He Ziming & He Jie

 Season 2

 Couples
 Julian Cheung & Anita Yuen
 Yi Sha & Ke Hu
 Yuelun Wang & Li Xiang

Rating 
In the ratings below, the highest rating for the show will be in red, and the lowest rating for the show will be in blue each season.

Season 1

References

External links 
 
 《一路上有你》樂視網專題
 Season 1
 Season 2

Chinese reality television series
2015 Chinese television series debuts
Zhejiang Television original programming